Neurose may refer to:

 Nowa Róża, Greater Poland Voivodeship, Poland, a village
 Labyrinth (1959 film), German–Italian drama